Jeff Smith (born 6 November 1975) is a Canadian professional darts player who plays in the Professional Darts Corporation (PDC) events. He reached the semi-final of the 2015 BDO World Darts Championship and the final of the 2016 BDO World Darts Championship in the following year where he faced Scott Waites.

Career
In his first tournament, Smith reached the semi-final of the Canada National Championships in 1996. He won the tournament in 2008 beating Jeff Noble. Smith entered the Professional Darts Corporation Q School in January 2011. He won a PDC tour card on the third and final day by defeating Ross Smith 6–2 in his final match. He took part in the 2013 PDC World Cup of Darts with John Part. In 2014, he returned to the BDO, and won the Halifax Open and the Canadian Open. 

He qualified for the 2015 BDO World Darts Championship, and entered the preliminary stage, where he beat Mike Day of New Zealand 3-0, hitting three 100+ checkouts. He then played two-time semi-finalist Wesley Harms in the last 32, winning 3–1 after losing the first set. Smith then beat Gary Robson 4-3 in the last 16, after Robson had recovered from 3-1 down to level the match. In the quarter-finals, Smith caused yet another upset as he beat bookmakers' favourite  Robbie Green 5-1, crucially hitting a 160 checkout to win the fourth set, with Green waiting on 56. Smith was beaten 6-0 by fourth seed and eventual champion Scott Mitchell in the semi-finals. Smith followed this good run by reaching the semi-finals of the 2015 BDO World Trophy, losing to Jeffrey de Graaf. 

He qualified for the 2016 BDO World Darts Championship, and entered the preliminary stage, where he beat Matthew Medhurst 3–0 with a 130 checkout. He played Martin Adams in the first round, winning 3–0. In the second round, be beat Brian Dawson 4–1. He played Dennis Harbour in the Quarter-Finals, winning 5–2 to reach the Semi-Finals. He played Richard Veenstra and won 6–5 to reach his first Final, where he played Scott Waites. In the final, Smith lost to Waites 7–1. In the post match interview, Smith promised to return next year. He received the runners up cheque of £35,000. In the 2017 BDO World Darts Championship Smith entered in the preliminary round, where he beat Seigo Asada 3–1. In the first round Smith beat Brian Dawson 3–2. In the second round Smith lost 4–1 to Martin Adams. 

Smith was a wild card entry into the 2018 PDC World Darts Championship. He hit a 170 checkout on his way to a 2–0 win against Luke Humphries in the preliminary round. In the first round Smith lost 3–0 to Gary Anderson. After his first round defeat in the 2018 PDC World Darts Championship he announced ‘I definitely will be playing Q-school this year, based on the current situation. I owe it to my family and my sponsors to carry on playing, wherever it takes me. I will do just that.’ Smith failed to gain a tour card at Q-School. Smith qualified for the 2019 PDC World Darts Championship by winning the North American Championship, securing his place with a 6–4 win over John Norman Jnr.

On 18 January 2020, Smith regained his PDC Tour Card by beating Seigo Asada 5–4 in the play-off match at day 3 of UK Q-School. He will play on the ProTour in 2020 and 2021.

World Championship results

BDO
 2015: Semi-final (lost to Scott Mitchell 0–6)
 2016: Runner-up (lost to Scott Waites 1–7)
 2017: Second round (lost to Martin Adams 1–4)

PDC
 2018: First round (lost to Gary Anderson 0–3)
 2019: First round (lost to Josh Payne 2–3)
 2021: Second round (lost to Chris Dobey 2–3)
 2022: First round (lost to Ross Smith 0–3)
 2023: First round (lost to Mike De Decker 1–3)

Career statistics

(W) Won; (F) finalist; (SF) semifinalist; (QF) quarterfinalist; (#R) rounds 6, 5, 4, 3, 2, 1; (RR) round-robin stage; (Prel.) Preliminary round; (DNQ) Did not qualify; (DNP) Did not participate; (NH) Not held

Performance timeline

PDC European Tour

Career finals

BDO major finals: 1 (1 runner-up)

References

External links
 

1975 births
Living people
Canadian darts players
Professional Darts Corporation current tour card holders
British Darts Organisation players
People from Hampton, New Brunswick
Sportspeople from Saint John, New Brunswick
PDC World Cup of Darts Canadian team